"The Beauty of Grace" is the second single from Krystal Meyers' second studio album Dying for a Heart. It was released to Christian Radio in early September 2006. "The Beauty of Grace" hit number four on the Christian CHR Chart and number two in Japan.

About "The Beauty of Grace"
"The Beauty of Grace" appears on: Dying for a Heart, Release Date: September 26, 2006, and Revolve: Inside Out, Release Date: September 11, 2007. "The Beauty of Grace" video was included in the Make Some Noise [Bonus DVD], Release Date: July 15, 2008.

Charts

References

2006 singles
Krystal Meyers songs
Songs written by Ian Eskelin
Songs written by Krystal Meyers
2006 songs
Essential Records (Christian) singles
Song recordings produced by Ian Eskelin